Ricardo Manuel Rodrigues Vieira da Silva (born 9 May 1999) is a Portuguese professional footballer who plays for Moreirense as a goalkeeper.

Club career
Born in Mafamude, Vila Nova de Gaia, Silva was formed at FC Porto. He made his LigaPro debut for FC Porto B on 19 April 2019 in a 2–1 loss at Sporting Covilhã. On 18 August, he was sent off in a 1–1 draw at home to Varzim.

On 30 January 2023, Silva signed with Moreirense until the end of the season.

References

External links

1999 births
Sportspeople from Vila Nova de Gaia
Living people
Portuguese footballers
Portugal youth international footballers
Association football goalkeepers
FC Porto B players
C.D. Santa Clara players
Moreirense F.C. players
Liga Portugal 2 players